Valerio Conti (born 30 March 1993) is an Italian cyclist, who currently rides for UCI ProTeam . He has competed in every edition of the Giro d'Italia between 2016 and 2022.

Major results

2010
 3rd Trofeo Città di Ivrea
 4th Overall Tre Ciclistica Bresciana
1st Stage 1
 7th Trofeo Dorigo Porte
2011
 1st Overall Tre Ciclistica Bresciana
1st Stages 1 (ITT) & 3
 1st Trofeo Dorigo Porte
 1st Stage 1 Trofeo Karlsberg
 National Junior Road Championships
2nd Time trial 
2nd Road race
 3rd Overall Giro della Lunigiana
 4th Road race, UEC European Junior Road Championships 
2013
 3rd Ruota d'Oro
 5th Gran Premio Palio del Recioto
2014
 1st Gran Premio Bruno Beghelli
 6th Japan Cup
 Vuelta a España
Held  after Stages 2 & 4
2015
 Tour of Japan
1st  Points classification
1st Stage 6
 10th Coppa Sabatini
2016
 1st Stage 13 Vuelta a España
2018
 5th Overall Adriatica Ionica Race
2019
 2nd Overall Presidential Tour of Turkey
 4th Overall Vuelta a San Juan
 Giro d'Italia
Held  after Stages 6–11
2020
 1st Trofeo Matteotti
2021
 2nd Giro dell'Appennino
 2nd Gran Premio di Lugano

Grand Tour general classification results timeline

References

External links

1993 births
Living people
Italian male cyclists
Italian Vuelta a España stage winners
Cyclists from Rome
21st-century Italian people